VCY may refer to:

 The variable-charge Y-linked gene, whose HGNC ID is 12668
 VCY America
 The reporting mark for the Ventura County Railway